Michael Stewart (born May 30, 1972) is a Canadian-Austrian former professional ice hockey defenceman who has become a coach after his playing days. He was drafted in the first round, thirteenth overall, of the 1990 NHL Entry Draft by the New York Rangers, but never played a game in the NHL.

Playing career 
Stewart attended Michigan State University for three seasons before signing with the New York Rangers in 1992. He then played for the Ranger's AHLaffiliate Binghamton Rangers for three seasons before being traded to the Hartford Whalers with Glen Featherstone in return for Pat Verbeek. Stewart then played for the Springfield Falcons (AHL) and Detroit Vipers (IHL) before playing with the Canadian National Team in 1996-97. After a 3-year stint with the Manitoba Moose of the IHL, Stewart spent the 2000-01 campaign with the Frankfurt Lions of the German DEL, before moving to Austria for the following season: Stewart played for EC VSV from 2001 to 2010, winning the Austrian championship in 2002 and 2006. He also represented the Austrian national team at the 2005, 2006, and 2007 World Championships. After an 18-year playing career Stewart retired as a member of the EC VSV. He is one of four players in the history of EC VSV hockey to have his jersey number retired.

Coaching career 
He started his coaching career as assistant coach to Johan Strömwall at EC VSV. In February 2011, he was promoted to head coach after Strömwall had stepped down.

Stewart moved to coach the Fischtown Pinguins of the German DEL2 in May 2012 and guided the team to the 2013-14 DEL2 championship, while being named DEL2 Coach of the Year. At the 2014 and 2016 Deutschland-Cup, he served as assistant coach of the Canadian national team. On April 30, 2015, he accepted an offer to become the head coach of German DEL side Augsburger Panther. 

In the 2018–19 season, he guided Augsburg to a playoff-semifinal appearance, before signing with fellow DEL team Kölner Haie in April 2019. Stewart tenure was brief with Kölner Haie unable to see out the 2019–20 season, as he was replaced by Uwe Krupp on February 24, 2020.

Personal 
Stewart received Austrian citizenship in March 2005. He has two daughters and a son.

Career statistics

Regular season and playoffs

International

References

External links

1972 births
Binghamton Rangers players
Canadian ice hockey defencemen
Detroit Vipers players
EC VSV players
Frankfurt Lions players
Living people
Manitoba Moose (IHL) players
Michigan State Spartans men's ice hockey players
National Hockey League first-round draft picks
New York Rangers draft picks
Ice hockey people from Calgary
Rochester Americans players
Springfield Falcons players
Canadian expatriate ice hockey players in Austria
Canadian expatriate ice hockey players in Germany